Safety Beach is a seaside town on the Mornington Peninsula in Melbourne, Victoria, Australia,  south of Melbourne's Central Business District, located within the Shire of Mornington Peninsula local government area. Safety Beach recorded a population of 6,328 at the 2021 census.

Safety Beach occupies slightly less than half the area of land between the foothills of Mount Martha and Arthurs Seat and borders Port Philip Bay to its west.

Martha Cove is a large inland harbour and residential development in Safety Beach. It was named after its location in the cove at the foot of Mount Martha. The project, which began in 2004, was initially  heavily protested by residents. After experiencing considerable financial difficulties, Martha Cove  recovered and became a thriving residential community.
Golfers play at the course of the Mount Martha Valley Golf Club on Country Club Drive, or at the Safety Beach Golf Course nearby.

Shark Bay was the former name of Safety Beach. The scent from cattle farms nestled in the area attracted many sharks to the site. Flinders Shire later changed the name to Safety Beach. Many tourists feared swimming in ‘Shark Bay’ for obvious reasons even after the farms were shut down and shark sightings had decreased which now as we know it is named Safety Beach, an attempt to draw tourists to the area, and it worked. Now there are over 100 beach/bathing boxes located on the beach, accommodating thousands of tourists a year. 
It was a breeding area for grey Nurse sharks in the 1950s and 1960s on the right side of the area towards Mount Martha and although they posed no threat many people would not swim because of the sightings and its subsequent name "Shark Bay". As it also had shallow sand bars, the suggestion was made to change it to "Safety Beach" by the local life savers and council. It was changed around 1963.

Beach activities

The area has a calm, sandy bay and a swimming beach which is popular for boating. The foreshore reserve has an attractive children's playground and BBQ areas with shading. 
Safety Beach Sailing Club was established in 1967. Safety Beach Sailing Club has hosted many State and National titles and SBSC sailors are recognized by the sailing community for their excellence in sailing with success at regattas and at State, National and International level.

History

Many believe  Safety Beach to originally have been named 'Shark Bay', but no official maps have this name. The area of port Phillip bay is called Dromana Bay and the first domestic subdivision around 1912 was called Dromana estate and was the blocks of land off Marine Drive and Dromana Parade from Pt Nepean road to around Dunns creek. 
Safety Beach gets its name from a journal entry of a trading vessel that run aground in storm and they were able to off load the livestock safely.
In 1841, Hugh Jamieson purchased , or eight square miles, of land from the Crown for £1 an acre under the terms of the short-lived Special Survey regulations.

The purchase included all of the present suburb of Safety Beach . The area is known as Jamieson's Special Survey in cadastral surveys. The survey extended east as far as Bulldog Creek Rd. Henry Dunn had leased the Survey from 1846 until 1851 and was succeeded by tenants such as the Griffith, Eaton, Peatey, McLear, Clydesdale, Wilson, Cottier and Gibson families, which were involved with the History of Dromana. Edward Louis Tassell leased the northern  for some time near the creek that is named after him.

Big Clarke later owned the survey, and sold the northern 1000 or so acres to John Vans Agnew Bruce. Maria Stenniken, who married Godfrey Burdett Wilson, used to work at Bruce's house as a servant during the summer. At the eastern end of the Survey, many of the pioneers worked at goldmining for Bernard Eaton. (Sources: A Dreamtime of Dromana, Lime Land Leisure, Rate records, 1888 Post office directory.)

Safety Beach Post Office opened on 1 October 1953 and closed in 1974.

Notable people
 George Calombaris

See also
 Shire of Flinders – Safety Beach was previously within this former local government area.

References

Suburbs of Melbourne
Suburbs of the Shire of Mornington Peninsula
Beaches of Victoria (Australia)